Ascension Episcopal School (AES), formally known as Ascension Day School (ADS), is a Private school in Lafayette Parish, Louisiana. It was founded in 1959 and consists of three separate campuses consisting of a preschool, an elementary school, a middle school, and a high school. It is accredited by the Independent Schools Association of the Southwest.

History 
Ascension Day School was founded in 1959 by Jeanette Parker with the support of the Rev. David J. Coughlin, then rector of the Episcopal Church of the Ascension, and several other dedicated parishioners and professionals. Parker served as the first Headmistress until 1968.

Athletics
Ascension Episcopal athletics competes in the LHSAA.

Championships
Football championships
(1) State Championship: 2016

External links
School Website

Private high schools in Louisiana
Private middle schools in Louisiana
Private elementary schools in Louisiana
Schools in Lafayette Parish, Louisiana
Episcopal schools in the United States
Independent Schools Association of the Southwest